The University of the Western Cape (UWC) is a public research university in Bellville, near Cape Town,  South Africa. The university was established in 1959 by the South African government as a university for Coloured people only. Other universities in Cape Town are the University of Cape Town, (UCT, originally for English speaking whites), Cape Peninsula University of Technology (CPUT) and the Stellenbosch University (originally for Afrikaans speaking whites). The establishing of UWC was a direct effect of the Extension of University Education Act, 1959. This law accomplished the segregation of higher education in South Africa. Coloured students were only allowed at a few non-white universities. In this period, other "ethnical" universities, such as the University of Zululand and the University of the North, were founded as well. Since well before the end of apartheid in South Africa in 1994, it has been an integrated and multiracial institution.

History

Early days

UWC started as a "bush college", a university college without autonomy under auspices of the University of South Africa. The university offered a limited training for lower to middle level positions in schools and civil service. In the first years of its existence, a great deal of the teaching staff was white. Many of the lecturers came from the university of Stellenbosch. The language in most lectures was Afrikaans. The first rector was N.J. Sieberhagen (from 1960 until 1973). The university started as a small institution: in the first year, 166 students were enrolled and the teaching staff numbered 17. In 1970, the institution gained university status and was able to award its own degrees and diplomas.

Resistance against apartheid
During the first 15 years, the board and staff were primarily whites, supporting the National Party and apartheid. One of the few exceptions was Adam Small, head of the Philosophy Department. Small was dismissed in 1973 as a consequence of his involvement in the Black Consciousness Movement. Apart from lecturers like Small, there were many students who were active in the struggle against apartheid, and who were loyal to the Black Consciousness Movement. Protests from students against the conservative university board and lack of participation in the university led to the appointment of the first coloured rector, Richard E. van der Ross in 1975. The years thereafter gave way to a more liberal atmosphere, in which the university gradually distanced itself from apartheid. In 1982, the university rejected the apartheid ideology formally in its mission statement; during the next year, the university gained the same autonomy as white universities through the University of the Western Cape Act.

In the late 1980s and early 1990s, numerous UWC students were involved in the creation of Bush Radio, an anti-apartheid media project which distributed political and cultural radio programming via cassette tape due to the lack of a license to broadcast on a conventional radio platform. By 1993, the station went to air as a pirate radio station, and eventually became South Africa's first licensed community radio station.

Rector Jakes Gerwel made UWC an "intellectual home of the left", with attention to social and political issues. The university attracted increasing numbers of students from disadvantaged communities. Apart from coloured people, more and more black students enrolled. Gerwel was succeeded in 1995 by Cecil Abrahams, who was succeeded by Brian O'Connell in 2001. UWC retained the status of an autonomous university during the education restructuring of 2002.

UWC is the only African institution that is a member of the OpenCourseWare Consortium (OCWC), and was voted onto the OCWC board in 2007.

Today
UWC is a research-rich environment. The academic staff is highly qualified, with 50% holding doctorates. Most departments have graduate programmes, some with the largest intake in the country. There are many institutes and centres with a strong research emphasis. And there are significant projects and programmes which draw on expertise across departments and faculties. There are also joint endeavours between the University of the Western Cape and the universities of Cape Town and Stellenbosch. 20% of all students at UWC are postgraduates.

Like other South African universities, UWC has been affected by sporadic student protests since 2015. The reasons for the protests change with each new period of protest. They began with the Fees Must Fall movement where the main goal was to get university fees to be state-funded and then grew to include issues surrounding student safety and accommodation. These protests often lead to the shutdown of academic activities at the university. Most recently academic activities were suspended from 5 February 2020 to 7 February 2020 due to a delay in financial clearance which left many students unable to register for the new year.

International links 
Research at UWC has an international dimension. UWC's major network of international partners ensures a flow of students and eminent scholars from other countries to enrich the environment. Some major projects are undertaken jointly with partners abroad. Many UWC scholars speak at international conferences and publish in internationally respected journals and books. And there is a strong and growing relationship with institutions in other countries in Africa, Europe and North America, leading to research partnerships, joint capacity building, and a flow of postgraduate students to UWC. In addition, UWC Honours and Master's graduates have won a number of major international scholarships. They have done well in doctoral programmes abroad.

Ranking

In 2014, Webometrics ranked the university the sixth best in South Africa, seventh best in Africa and 885th in the world. Webometrics ranked both the university's Faculty of Law and Dentistry the best in Africa.

Children's Rights Project
The Children's Rights Project is a South African organisation. Located in the Community Law Centre, University of the Western Cape, its goal is the recognition and protection of children's rights within the framework of the United Nations Convention on the Rights of the Child, the African Charter on the Rights and Welfare of the Child and the Constitution of the Republic of South Africa.

Notable alumni

 Kamanda Bataringaya, . Ugandan physician, diplomat and politician. Member of Parliament and Minister of State for Primary Education in Uganda (2009–2016). Obtained the degree of Master of Public Health from UWC in 2009.
 José Luís Guterres, East Timorese politician and diplomat
 Danny Jordaan, chief executive officer of the 2010 FIFA World Cup South Africa
 Sibongile Ndashe, lawyer and human rights activist
 Maurus Nekaro, Namibian politician, former Governor of Kavango Region (2010–2013) 
 John Walters (born 1956), Namibian ombudsman 2004–2021
 Zoe Wicomb, author, both attended and taught at UWC.

See also 
 S*, a collaboration between seven universities and the Karolinska Institutet for training in bioinformatics and genomics
 Open access in South Africa and List of South African open access repositories

References

External links

 Official website of the University of the Western Cape
 Du Pré, R. H. (1996) Historical positioning. In: Thomas, Cornelis C. (1997) Wakker wakker en aan the brand; Waarneminge van a studente-aktivis, UWK 1976. Mayibuye History and Literature Series No.75.
 Free Courseware Project at the University of the Western Cape
Southern African University

 

 
Western Cape, University of the
Education in Cape Town
Western Cape, University of the
Educational institutions established in 1959
1959 establishments in South Africa